The Decretals of Gregory IX, also collectively called the , are a source of medieval Catholic canon law. It has been said that the pope used these letters to emphasize his power over the Universal Church.

Political circumstances
During Gregory's papacy, the church had established a prominent role in the temporal and spiritual affairs of Europe. Following his predecessor, Pope Honorius III, Gregory maintained papal supremacy. Nevertheless, the utility of a new collection was so evident that there may be no other motives than those the pope gives in the Bull "Rex pacificus" of 5 September 1234, viz., the inconvenience of referring to several collections containing decisions most diverse and sometimes contradictory, exhibiting in some cases gaps and in others tedious length; moreover, on several matters the law was uncertain.

Work of St. Raymond

He borrowed from them the order of the subject-matter, the division into five books, of the books into titles and of the titles into chapters. They are arranged, generally, according to the order of the ancient collections, i.e., each title opens with the chapters of the first collection, followed by those of the second, and so on in regular order. Next come those of Innocent III, and finally those of Gregory IX. Almost all the rubrics, or headings of the titles, have also been borrowed from these collections, but several have been modified as regards detail. This method considerably lightened St. Raymond's task.

Editorial work
Pope Gregory IX's work involved the compilation of documents from former collections, modifying some decisions whilst discarding others. Additionally, Gregory omitted parts when he considered it prudent to do so, filled in the gaps, and cleared up doubtful points of the ancient ecclesiastical law by adding some new decretals to ensure his work was clear and concordant. He indicated by the words et infra the passages excised by him in the former collections. They are called partes decisae. The new compilation bore no special title, but was called "Decretales Gregorii IX" or sometimes "Compilatio sexta", i. e. the sixth collection with reference to the "Quinque compilationes antiquæ". It was also called "Collectio seu liber extra", i. e. the collection of the laws not contained (vagantes extra) in the "Decretum" of Gratian. Hence the custom of denoting this collection by the letter X (i.e. extra, here not the Roman numeral for ten).

Force of law

All its decisions had the force of canon law whether they were authentic or not, whatever the juridical value of the texts considered in themselves, and whatsoever the original text. It is a unique collection; all its decisions were simultaneously promulgated, and are equally obligatory, even if they appear to contain, or if in fact they do contain, antinomies, i. e. contradictions. In this peculiar case it is not possible to overcome the difficulty by recourse to the principle that a law of later date abrogates that of an earlier period. Finally, it is an exclusive collection, i.e. it abrogates all the collections, even the official ones, of a later date than the "Decretum" of Gratian. Some authors (Schulte, Launin) maintain that Gregory IX abrogated even those laws prior to Gratian's time that the latter had not included in his "Decretum", but others contest this opinion.

Glosses
Like the former canonical collections, the Decretals of Gregory IX were soon glossed. It was customary to add to the manuscript copies textual explanations written between the lines (glossa interlinearis) and on the margin of the page (glossa marginalis). Explanations of the subject-matter were also added. The most ancient glossarist of the Decretals of Gregory IX is Vincent of Spain; then follow Godefridus de Trano (died 1245), Bonaguida Aretinus (thirteenth century) and Bernard of Botone or Parmensis (died 1263), the author of the "Glossa ordinaria", i.e., of that gloss to which authoritative credence was generally given. At a later date some extracts were added to the "Glossa ordinaria" from the "Novella sive commentarius in decretales epistolas Gregorii IX" by Giovanni d'Andrea (Johannes Andreæ).

Printed publication
After the invention of printing, the Decretals of Gregory IX were first published at Strasburg from the press of Heinrich Eggesteyn. Among the numerous editions that followed, special mention must be made of that published in 1582 (in dibus populi romani) by order of Gregory XIII. The text of this edition, revised by the Correctores Romani, a pontifical commission established for the revision of the text of the "Corpus Juris", had the force of canon law, even when it differed from that of St. Raymond. It was forbidden to introduce any change into that text (Papal Brief "Cum pro munere", 1 July 1580). Among the other editions, mention may be made of that by Le Conte (Antwerp, 1570), of prior date to the Roman edition and containing the partes decis; that of the brothers Pithou (Paris, 1687); that of Böhmer (Halle, 1747), which did not reproduce the text of the Roman edition and was in its textual criticism more audacious than happy; the edition of Richter; and that of Friedberg (Leipzig, 1879-1881). All these authors added critical notes and the partes decis.

Commentators

To indicate the principal commentators on the Decretals would mean writing a history of canon law in the Middle Ages. Important canonists include Innocent IV (died 1254), Enrico de Segusio or Hostiensis (died 1271), the "Abbas antiquus" (thirteenth century), Johannes Andreæ, Baldus de Ubaldis (died 1400), Petrus de Ancharano (died 1416), Franciscus de Zabarellis (died 1417), Dominicus a Sancto Geminiano (fifteenth century), Joannes de Imola (died 1436) and Nicolò Tudesco also called the "Abbas Siculus", or "Modernus", or "Panormitanus" (died 1453). Among the modern commentators, Manuel Gonzalez Tellez and Fagnanus may be consulted advantageously for the interpretation of the text of the Decretals. The Decretals of Gregory IX remain the basis of canon law so far as it has not been modified by subsequent collections and by the general laws of the Church (see Corpus Juris Canonici).

References

External links
From the Rare Book and Special Collections Division at the Library of Congress:
Decretales Gregorii, Volume One
Decretales Gregorii, Volume Two
Decretales Gregorii, Volume Three

Complete Latin text of the Decretals of Gregory IX (Books I-V)

Canon law codifications
1234 works
Raymond of Penyafort